Princeton is an unincorporated community in Lancaster County, Nebraska, United States.

Demographics

History
Princeton was founded in 1886. It was likely named after Princeton, New Jersey.

A post office was established in Princeton in 1886, and remained in operation until it was discontinued in 1959. Pat Rileys father was born here.Leon Francis Riley Sr.
During a playing career that stretched from 1927 to 1942 and 1944 to 1949, Riley appeared in 2,267 minor league games for 21 different teams, with a brief trial with the 1944 Philadelphia Phillies during the World War II manpower shortage. He was the father of Lee and Pat Riley.

References

Unincorporated communities in Lancaster County, Nebraska
Unincorporated communities in Nebraska